WBU is the World Boxing Union, a boxing sanctioning body.

WBU may also refer to:

Organisations
 World Blind Union, an organization representing the blind or partially sighted
 Welsh Badminton Union, the national governing body for badminton in Wales, now renamed Badminton Wales
 Welsh Baseball Union, the national governing body of British baseball in Wales
 World Broadcasting Unions, see Asia-Pacific Broadcasting Union

Other uses
 Boulder Municipal Airport (IATA code), US
 Wayland Baptist University, US